Parmotrema lawreyi is a species of corticolous (bark-dwelling), foliose lichen in the family Parmeliaceae. Found on the Galápagos Islands, it was formally described as a new species in 2019 by lichenologists Frank Bungartz and Adriano Spielmann. The type specimen was collected by the first author from the foothills of Media Luna on San Cristóbal Island, where it was found in dry, open woodland growing on the trunk of Bursera graveolens. The species epithet honours the authors' colleague James D. Lawrey, "on the occasion of his 70th birthday".

Description

The upper thallus surface of Parmotrema lawreyi is a pale greenish-yellow color and appears dull, smooth, and not wrinkled, with occasional cracks but not forming a distinctly net-like pattern.

The  of Parmotrema lawreyi are moderate-sized, rotund, and have incised axils. The margins of the lobes are usually smooth, without , but may rarely have a few cilia. The lower surface of the lichen has a deep brown margin that is about 1–2.5 mm wide and is moderately to densely rhizinate, meaning it has short, stout, black rhizines that can be  or sparsely branched. The medulla (the tissue inside the lichen) is white.

The  contains both atranorin and usnic acid, while the medulla has protocetraric acid. The expected results of standard chemical spot tests in the cortex are P+ (yellow),K+ (yellow), KC−, C−, UV−; and in the medulla P+ (yellow turning orange), K+ (yellowish brown), KC−, C−, UV−.

See also
List of Parmotrema species

References

lawreyi
Lichen species
Lichens described in 2019
Lichens of the Galápagos Islands